Kira Borisovna Povarova (born September 3, 1933) is a Russian material scientist, professor, doctor of technical sciences, recipient of a number of state and academic awards.

Monographs
K. B. Povarova, Evgenij Michajlovič Savickij, "Splavy tugoplavkich i redkich metallov dlja raboty pri vysokich temperaturach", Nauka, 1984
Evgenij Michajlovič Savickij, K. B. Povarova, M. A. Tylkina, "Rhenium Alloys", CCM Information Corporation, 1965
 K. B. Povarova, "PROPERTIES AND USES OF RHENIUM", 1965
 Сплавы рения. М.: Наука, 1965, 323 с. Соавторы: Савицкий Е.М., Тылкина М.А.
 Металловедение вольфрама. М.: Металлургия, 1978, 223 с. Соавторы: Савицкий Е.М., Макаров П.В.
 Тугоплавкие металлы и сплавы. М.: Металлургия, 1986, 352 с. Соавторы: Савицкий Е.М., Бурханов Г.С. и др.

Awards
1968: USSR State Prize
1996: H.N. Anosov Prize of the Russian Academy of Sciences
2001: Russian Federation Government Prize in Science and Technology(:ru:Премия Правительства Российской Федерации в области науки и техники)

References

1933 births
Russian materials scientists
Recipients of the USSR State Prize
Living people